Elisabeth Hasse (December 24, 1917 – October 3, 1946) was a Nazi SS female supervisor and guard at Auschwitz concentration camp.

Life

Hasse was known for her brutal treatment of prisoners at Auschwitz concentration camp. After the war, she was tried by a Soviet military tribunal, found guilty of war crimes, sentenced to death, and executed.

References

Auschwitz concentration camp personnel
Executed German women
Executed Nazi concentration camp personnel
1917 births
Female guards in Nazi concentration camps
1945 deaths